Insect olfactory receptors (also known as odorant receptors, ORs) are expressed in the cell membranes of the olfactory sensory neurons of insects. Similarly to mammalian olfactory receptors, in insects each olfactory sensory neuron expresses one type of OR, allowing the specific detection of a volatile chemical. Differently to mammalian ORs, insect ORs form a heteromer with a fixed monomer, Orco, and a variable OR monomer, which confers the odour specificity.

Insect ORs are transmembrane proteins with seven transmembrane helices similarly to G protein coupled receptors, but they have the reverse topology with an intracellular N-terminal and an extracellular C-terminal instead.

The number of ORs in different species of insects is extremely variable ranging from as few as 8 in the damselfly, to 60 in the fruit fly Drosophila melanogaster, even to more than 500 in some ant species, reflecting the variability in odorant perception requirements associated to different lifestyles and social interactions.

Insect ORs are investigated as targets for pest control given the possibility of altering the behaviour of insects by activating particular ORs with natural or optimized chemicals.

References 

Olfactory receptors
Sensory receptors
Olfactory system
Insect physiology